Longuinhos dos Santos (born 4 July 1974) is an East Timorese politician, and a member of the People's Liberation Party (PLP).

He is the incumbent Minister of Higher Education, Science and Culture, serving since June 2018 in the VIII Constitutional Government of East Timor led by Prime Minister Taur Matan Ruak.

Early life and education
Between 1982 and 1991, Santos attended primary and then pre-secondary school in Maliana. He completed his secondary education, in the Liquiçá Municipality, in 1994, but was then prevented by the then political circumstances in East Timor from continuing his studies. Until the 1999 East Timorese independence referendum, he provided services to clandestine liberation networks.

Santos resumed his studies in 2001, at the Faculty of Economics and Management of the National University of Timor-Leste (UNTL). He completed that course in 2007.

Career
Santos has had an academic career. As of 2014, he was the Second Vice-Dean of the UNTL.

On 22 June 2018, he was sworn in as Minister of Higher Education, Science and Culture.

References

External links 

Government ministers of East Timor
Living people
People's Liberation Party (East Timor) politicians
Year of birth missing (living people)
1974 births
21st-century East Timorese politicians